The 1973–74 QMJHL season was the fifth season in the history of the Quebec Major Junior Hockey League. East and west divisions resumed with the addition of two new teams, the Hull Festivals and Chicoutimi Saguenéens. Eleven teams played 70 games each in the schedule, up from the 64 games the previous season.

The season sparked an offensive explosion, unmatched in Canadian Hockey League history. The Sorel Éperviers finished first overall in the regular season, and set a CHL record of 620 goals scored as a team. Three Sorel players, Pierre Larouche, Michel Deziel and Jacques Cossette, had more than 90 goals and 200 points each. Sorel goalkeeper Claude Legris won the top goaltender award, despite posting a 4.50 goals against average; the highest GAA of any Jacques Plante Memorial Trophy winner to date.

Pierre Larouche set a Canadian junior ice hockey record scoring record for most points scored in a season with 251, that lasted until the 1983–84 QMJHL season when broken by Mario Lemieux. Three different players, Mike Bossy, Alain Daigle and Bob Sirois each scored 70 goals or more in the season, yet none were in the top ten league scoring leaders.

The Quebec Remparts finished second place in the regular season despite scoring 531 goals as a team, the second highest in CHL history. Quebec won the President's Cup, defeating the first place Sorel Éperviers in the finals.

Team changes
 The Shawinigan Bruins are renamed the Shawinigan Dynamos.
 The Trois-Rivières Ducs are renamed the Trois-Rivières Draveurs.
 The Chicoutimi Saguenéens join the league as an expansion franchise.
 The Hull Festivals join the league as an expansion franchise.

Final standings
Note: GP = Games played; W = Wins; L = Losses; T = Ties; Pts = Points; GF = Goals for; GA = Goals against

complete list of standings.

Scoring leaders
Note: GP = Games played; G = Goals; A = Assists; Pts = Points; PIM = Penalties in Minutes

 complete scoring statistics

Playoffs
Jacques Locas was the leading scorer of the playoffs with 51 points (18 goals, 33 assists).

Quarterfinals
 Sorel Éperviers defeated Trois-Rivières Draveurs 4 games to 0.
 Quebec Remparts defeated Shawinigan Dynamos 4 games to 0.
 Laval National defeated Cornwall Royals 4 games to 1.
 Montreal Bleu Blanc Rouge defeated Sherbrooke Castors 4 games to 1.

Semifinals
 Sorel Éperviers defeated Montreal Bleu Blanc Rouge 4 games to 0.
 Quebec Remparts defeated Laval National 4 games to 2.

Finals
 Quebec Remparts defeated Sorel Éperviers 4 games to 2.

All-star teams
First team
 Goaltender – Bob Sauve, Laval National
 Left defence – Denis Carufel, Sorel Éperviers
 Right defence – Bob Murray, Cornwall Royals
 Left winger – Michel Deziel, Sorel Éperviers
 Centreman – Gary MacGregor, Cornwall Royals
 Right winger – Jacques Cossette, Sorel Éperviers
 Coach – Ghislain Delage, Sherbrooke Castors
Second team 
 Goaltender – Andre Lepage, Drummondville Rangers 
 Left defence – Jean Bernier, Shawinigan Bruins
 Right defence – Richard Mulhern, Sherbrooke Castors 
 Left winger – Claude Larose, Drummondville Rangers 
 Centreman – Pierre Larouche, Sorel Éperviers
 Right winger – Real Cloutier, Quebec Remparts
 Coach – Ron Racette, Cornwall Royals
 List of First/Second/Rookie team all-stars.

Trophies and awards
Team
President's Cup – Playoff Champions, Quebec Remparts
Jean Rougeau Trophy – Regular Season Champions, Sorel Éperviers

Player
Michel Brière Memorial Trophy – Most Valuable Player, Gary MacGregor, Cornwall Royals
Jean Béliveau Trophy – Top Scorer, Pierre Larouche, Sorel Éperviers
Jacques Plante Memorial Trophy – Best GAA, Claude Legris, Sorel Éperviers
Michel Bergeron Trophy – Rookie of the Year, Mike Bossy, Laval National
Frank J. Selke Memorial Trophy – Most sportsmanlike player, Gary MacGregor, Cornwall Royals

See also
1974 Memorial Cup
1974 NHL Entry Draft
1973–74 OHA season
1973–74 WCHL season

References
 Official QMJHL Website
 www.hockeydb.com/

Quebec Major Junior Hockey League seasons
QMJHL